Andrey Shamruk (born 27 April 1994) is a Belarusian professional footballer who plays for Dinamo Brest.

External links 
 
 
 Profile at Dinamo Brest website

1994 births
Living people
Sportspeople from Brest, Belarus
Belarusian footballers
Association football midfielders
FC Dynamo Brest players
FC Baranovichi players
FC Smolevichi players
FC Minsk players
FC Vitebsk players